There are two rivers named Laranjeiras River in Brazil:

 Laranjeiras River (Paraná)
 Laranjeiras River (Santa Catarina)

See also
 Laranjeiras (disambiguation)